The Desulfosarcinaceae are a family in the order Desulfobacterales.

References

Desulfobacterales
Bacteria families